Balzo may refer to:

Clothing
Balzo headdress

Notable people with the surname
House of Baux
Antonia of Balzo (1355–1374), the second Queen consort of Frederick III the Simple
Giovanni Antonio del Balzo Orsini (1386–1463), Prince of Taranto, Duke of Bari, etc.
Isabella del Balzo (died 1533), the second wife and only Queen consort of Frederick IV of Naples
Liana Del Balzo (1899–1982), Italian film actress
Raimondo del Balzo Orsini (died 1406), remarkable nobleman of the Kingdom of Naples
Mary of Baux-Orange